Mario Ventura (born 21 April 1974) is a Jamaican cricketer. He played in 39 first-class and 10 List A matches for the Jamaican cricket team from 1992 to 2004.

See also
 List of Jamaican representative cricketers

References

External links
 

1974 births
Living people
Jamaican cricketers
Jamaica cricketers
Sportspeople from Kingston, Jamaica